Abdoul Moubarak Djeri (born December 30, 1995) is an Togolese American football defensive end who is currently playing for the Frankfurt Galaxy. He played in the German Football League for the Cologne Crocodiles.

Early life
Djeri was born in Togo in West Africa and moved to Germany in 2007.

Professional career

Cologne Crocodiles
Djeri played for the Cologne Crocodiles from 2014 to 2017 with his final year recording 12 sacks, 40 tackles, 10 tackles for loss and two forced fumbles.

Arizona Cardinals
On March 28, 2018, Djeri signed a one-year contract with the Arizona Cardinals. On July 27, 2018, Djeri was cut from the Cardinals.

Frankfurt Galaxy
In January 2023, Djeri signed with the Frankfurt Galaxy ahead of the 2023 European League of Football season.

References

Living people
American football defensive ends
German Football League players
Arizona Cardinals players
Togolese emigrants to Germany
Togolese players of American football
1995 births
International Player Pathway Program participants
Expatriate players of American football
Togolese expatriates in the United States
Frankfurt Galaxy (ELF) players